Fellows of the Royal Society elected in 1829.

Fellows

 Francis Basset (1757–1835)
 Joseph Bosworth (1789–1876)
 William Cavendish (1808–1891)
 Henry Coddington (d. 1845)
 William Willoughby Cole (1807–1886)
 Bransby Blake Cooper (1792–1853)
 Alexander Crombie (1762–1840)
 William Frederick Edwards (1776–1842)
 John Elliotson (1791–1868)
 George Evelyn (1791–1829)
 John Forbes (1787–1861)
 Henry Hennell (d. 1842)
 George Henry Hutchinson (d. 1852)
 John William Lubbock (1803–1865)
 Ebenezer Fuller Maitland (1780–1858)
 John Maxwell (1791–1865)
 Charles Phillips (d. 1840)
 William Pole (1798–1884)
 Sir David Pollock (1780–1847)
 Isaac Robinson (d. 1839)
 John Robert Steuart (d. 1853)
 John Stuart-Wortley (1801–1855)
 Charles Tennyson d'Eyncourt (1784–1861)
 Nathaniel Wallich (1786–1854)
 Alexander Luard Wollaston (1804–1874)

Foreign members

 Antoine Laurent de Jussieu (1748–1836) formemrs

References

1829 in science
1829
1829 in the United Kingdom